La Méthode Bourchnikov is a 2004 French short animated film directed by Grégoire Sivan.

Cast 
 Lorànt Deutsch as Alexandre Goübrick
 Dieudonné M'bala M'bala as Roman Goübrick
 Catherine Jacob as Sylvette Martin
 Daniel Prévost as The TV Host
 Macha Béranger as Elizabeth Dorsay
 Beppe Chierici as Michello Bracchelloni
 Emanuel Booz as Max Byzance
 Prune Mascuro as Elizabeth Dorsay
 Pascale Clarke as The journalist

Production
In 2004, the short was presented to the Angers Film Festival, the Clermont-Ferrand International Short Film Festival, the CFC Worldwide Short Film Festival, the French Film Festival in Japan and the Meudon Short Film Festival.

Awards and nominations

References

External links

French animated short films
2000s French-language films
2004 films
2000s French animated films
2000s French films